The 1938 New Year Honours in New Zealand were appointments by King George VI to various orders and honours to reward and highlight good works by New Zealanders. The awards celebrated the passing of 1937 and the beginning of 1938, and were announced on 1 January 1938.

The recipients of honours are displayed here as they were styled before their new honour.

Order of Saint Michael and Saint George

Companion (CMG)
 Dr Theodore Grant Gray  – of Wellington; director-general of mental hospitals.
 Garnet Hercules Mackley – of Wellington; general manager, Railways Department.

Order of the British Empire

Knight Commander (KBE)
Civil division
 Theodore Rigg   – of Nelson; director of the Cawthron Institute.

Commander (CBE)
Civil division
 Elgin Nathaniel George Poulton – of Wellington; private secretary to the Minister of Internal Affairs.

Military division
 Colonel Searle Dwyer Mason  – of Timaru; Commander 3rd New Zealand Infantry Brigade, Southern Command, New Zealand Military Forces.

Officer (OBE)
Civil division
 Dr Edward Pohau Ellison  – chief medical officer, and deputy resident commissioner, Cook Islands.
 David John Evans  – of Hokitika; clerk, Westland County Council.
 Mary Isabel Lambie – of Wellington; director of the Division of Nursing, Health Department.
 George McCloghrie – constructor, Royal Corps of Naval Constructors; manager of the Naval Base at Devonport, Auckland.
 John Samuel Neville – town clerk, Christchurch.

Military division
 Commander Charles Bourdas Tinley – Royal Navy; commanding officer, HMS Philomel, and naval officer in charge and superintendent, Auckland.

Member (MBE)
Civil division
 Gwendoline Gretchen Hoddinott – of Dunedin; administrative secretary, Royal New Zealand Society for the Health of Women and Children.
 Ethel Anne Kidd  – of Auckland. For social-welfare services.
 Annie McVicar  – of Wellington. For public and social-welfare services.
 George Millar – of Runanga; a mining engineer.
 William Perkin Williams – of Lower Hutt. For social-welfare services.

Military division
 Warrant Officer Class I Sydney Alexander Noble – Royal New Zealand Air Force, Hobsonville.

References

New Year Honours
1938 awards
1938 in New Zealand
New Zealand awards